Raymont may refer to:

People 
Katherine Raymont (born 1959), Australian cricket player
Peter Raymont (born 1950), Canadian filmmaker and producer 
Raymont Harris (born 1970), former American football running back

Other uses 
Raymont Residential College, a student residential college